= Isaac A. Murchison =

American politician (1850-?)

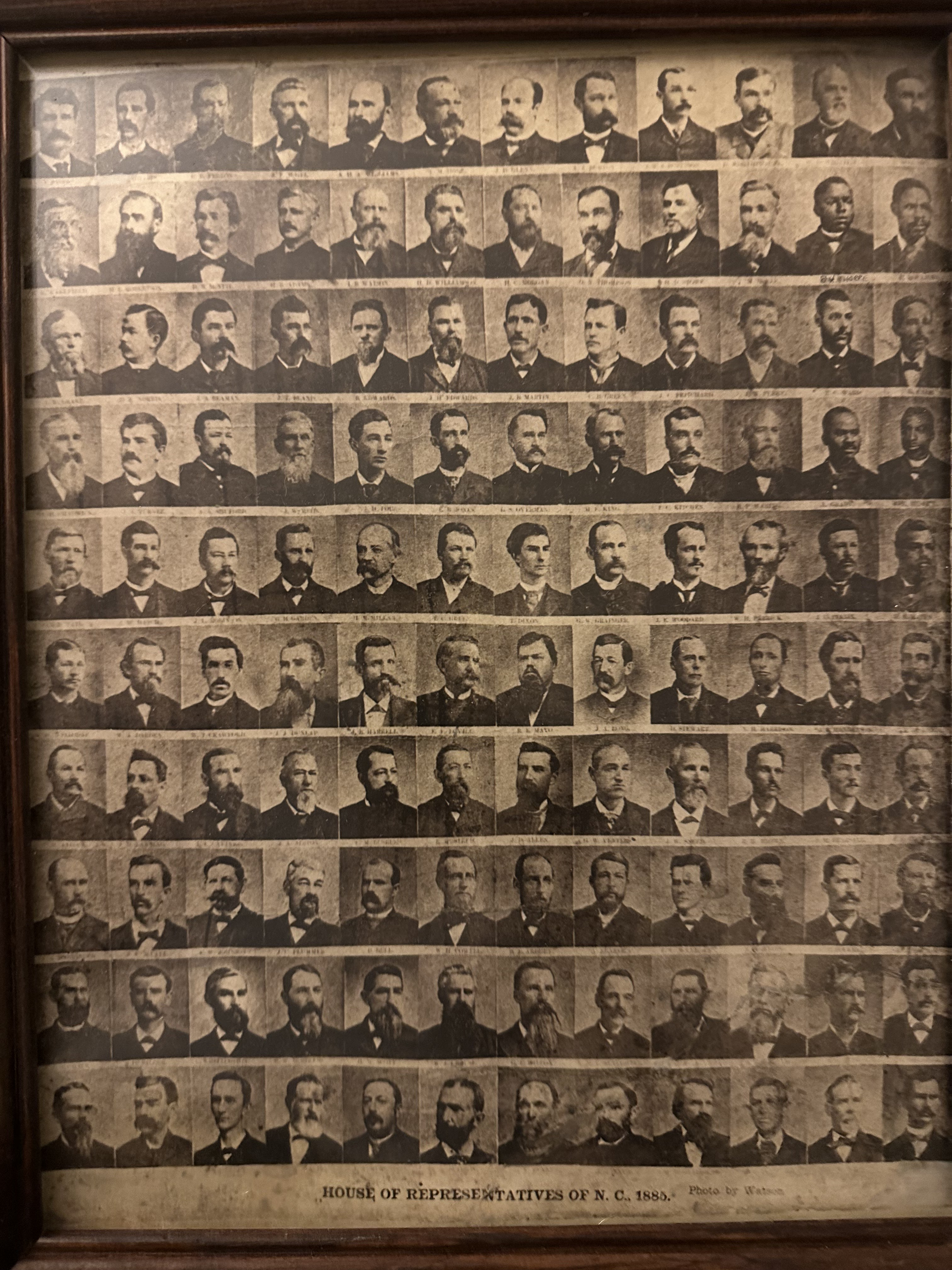
Members of the North Carolina House of Representatives in 1885

Isaac A. Muchison (1850-1937?) was a lawyer, plantation owner, and state legislator in North Carolina. He was a lawyer in Fayetteville, North Carolina, before moving to the Holly Hill plantation in Cumberland.

Part of a prominent family, he was born at Holly Hill in Manchester, North Carolina.

He partnered with W. H. Pope in 1897.

His hoe and rake design was patented.

His wife was reported to be the second woman in North Carolina to be licensed as a lawyer.
